Treadstone is an American action drama television series, connected to and based on the Bourne film series. A "special preview" of the pilot aired on USA Network on September 24, 2019, ahead of its October 15, 2019, premiere. The series was created by Tim Kring, who is also the executive producer alongside Ramin Bahrani, Ben Smith, Jeffrey Weiner, Justin Levy, Bradley Thomas, and Dan Friedkin. In May 2020, the series was canceled after one season.

Premise
Treadstone explores the origin story and present-day actions of a fictional CIA black-ops program known as Operation Treadstone — a covert program that uses a behavior modification protocol to turn recruits into nearly-superhuman assassins. The series follows sleeper agents across the globe as they are mysteriously 'awakened' to resume their deadly missions. The program breaks down these assassins' personalities, erases their memories, and eliminates their moral code so they can effectively kill targets around the world.

The series explores Treadstone's legacy and begins with an incident in East Berlin in 1973. This involves John Randolph Bentley (Jeremy Irvine), one of the program's agents, who escapes his Soviet captors. The story then zooms to the present day, following a group of assets being "activated" by force or awakened after a moment of high tension.

Cast

Main
 Jeremy Irvine as John Randolph Bentley
 Tracy Ifeachor as Tara Coleman
 Han Hyo-joo as Soyun Park
 Omar Metwally as Matt Edwards
 Brian J. Smith as Doug McKenna
 Gabrielle Scharnitzky as Petra Andropov
 Emilia Schüle as young Petra
 Michelle Forbes as Ellen Becker

Recurring
 Michael Gaston as Dan Levine
 Jung-woo Seo as Dae Park
 Min-jun Woo as Jin-woo
 Tess Haubrich as Samantha McKenna
 Patrick Fugit as Stephen Haynes (credited as "Special guest star")
 Lee Jong-hyuk as Colonel Shin
 Oliver Walker as Matheson
 Shruti Haasan as Nira Patel
 Merab Ninidze as Yuri Leniov (present day)

Episodes

Production

Development
On April 12, 2018, it was announced that USA Network had given the production a pilot order. The episode was written by Tim Kring and expected to be directed by Ramin Bahrani, both of whom were also set to act as executive producers alongside Ben Smith, Jeffrey Weiner, Justin Levy, and Bradley Thomas. Production companies involved with the pilot were slated to consist of Universal Cable Productions, Captivate Entertainment, and Imperative Entertainment. On August 16, 2018, it was reported that USA Network had decided to forego the pilot process and instead were issuing the production a straight-to-series order. Additionally, it was reported that Dan Friedkin was joining the series as an executive producer. On December 17, 2019, the series was canceled after one season.

Casting
On November 8, 2018, it was announced that Jeremy Irvine and Brian J. Smith had been cast in lead roles. On January 14, 2019, it was reported Omar Metwally, Tracy Ifeachor, Han Hyo-joo, Gabrielle Scharnitzky, and Emilia Schüle had joined the main cast. Michelle Forbes, Michael Gaston and Shruti Haasan were added to the cast, with Patrick Fugit and Tess Haubrich also appearing in a recurring capacity.

Filming
Principal photography for the series had begun by January 2019 in Budapest.

Reception
Treadstone received a metacritic score of 47 based on seven critics, indicating mixed or average reviews. Rotten Tomatoes gave an approval rating of 44% based on 16 critics, its consensus reads: "While Treadstone is as action-packed and frenetically paced as you'd expect from the Bourne universe, it lacks the narrative momentum and cohesion necessary to set it apart."

Broadcast 
Outside the United States, the series premiered on Amazon Prime Video on January 10, 2020.

In South Korea, the series premiered on OCN on June 18, 2021.

Home media 
The series was released on DVD for Universal Pictures Home Entertainment on March 24, 2020.

See also
 The Sleep Room
 Project MKUltra

Notes

References

External links
 
 

2010s American drama television series
2019 American television series debuts
2019 American television series endings
English-language television shows
Jason Bourne
Live action television shows based on films
North Korea in fiction
Serial drama television series
Television shows set in North Korea
American prequel television series
American sequel television series
Television series set in the 1970s
Television series set in the 2010s
Television series created by Tim Kring
Television series by Universal Content Productions
USA Network original programming